Gianfrancesco Ugoni was a Roman Catholic prelate who served as Bishop of Famagusta (1530–1543).

Biography
On 10 January 1530, Gianfrancesco Ugoni was appointed during the papacy of Pope Clement VII as Bishop of Famagusta. In February 1530, he was consecrated bishop by Paolo Zane, Bishop of Brescia; and Mattia Ugoni, Bishop Emeritus of Famagusta. He served as Bishop of Famagusta until his death in 1543.

References

External links and additional sources
 (for Chronology of Bishops) 
 (for Chronology of Bishops) 

16th-century Roman Catholic bishops in the Republic of Venice
1543 deaths
Bishops appointed by Pope Clement VII